Martín Ríos (born 7 July 1978) is an Argentine judoka. He competed in the men's half-lightweight event at the 2000 Summer Olympics.

References

1978 births
Living people
Argentine male judoka
Olympic judoka of Argentina
Judoka at the 2000 Summer Olympics
Place of birth missing (living people)
Pan American Games medalists in judo
Pan American Games gold medalists for Argentina
Judoka at the 1999 Pan American Games
Medalists at the 1999 Pan American Games
20th-century Argentine people
21st-century Argentine people